Norma Wilson (14 September 1929 – 15 January 2022) was an Australian cricketer.
Wilson played three tests for the Australia national women's cricket team.

Wilson died in January 2022, aged 92.

References

1929 births
Australia women Test cricketers
Living people
People from Colac, Victoria
Cricketers from Victoria (Australia)